Double Dragon is an animated series based on the NES versions of the Double Dragon video game trilogy, that ran for 26 half-hour episodes from 1993 to 1994. It was produced by DIC Animation City, Bohbot Entertainment, and Italian studio Reteitalia, S.p.A., in association with Spanish network Telecinco.

Overview
The premise of the show is that the protagonist brothers are separated at birth. Billy is raised by an elderly martial arts master known as the Oldest Dragon, and his brother Jimmy is raised by the evil Shadow Master as his second-in-command, the Shadow Boss. As a result, the Lee brothers oppose each other as adults. When Jimmy is betrayed by the Shadow Master, he renounces his evil ways and joins his brother as a Dragon Warrior. During the course of the series, the brothers recruit allies in their war against the Shadow Master and his henchmen. The futile search for their father, John Lee, is a subplot throughout the series.

The plot of the pilot episode is loosely adapted from the NES version of the first Double Dragon game. The villains are the mysterious Shadow Boss (Jimmy's initial alter-ego), and his henchmen Abobo and Willy (who were based on enemy characters from the game). By the end of the second episode, Abobo and Willy are sucked into the Shadow Mural, never to be seen again, while Jimmy abandons his evil ways and reconciles with his brother to fight against the series' true antagonist, the Shadow Master. All of the characters introduced from the second episode onward are original creations made for the show, although most of the villains are also used in the Tradewest-produced Double Dragon V: The Shadow Falls, a competitive fighting game released for home consoles.

Cast of characters
The Lee brothers are martial-arts instructors and police consultants, who assume superheroic identities at moments of escalated violence. They usually transform out of those forms by crossing swords again and saying in unison, "For Might! For Right! We are Double Dragons!", although several episodes show that heavy injury can deactivate their powers. Injury sustained by one is sometimes taken by the other. The brothers sometimes sense when the other is in danger. 

In this series, the Double Dragons are adept in a mystical form of the Kenjutsu arts, even though in the games they have more of a mastery in both the Bōjutsu arts with any bō or club, and the Kusari-fundo arts involving any whip or nunchaku they can find.

Billy Lee is the former devoted Dragon Pupil turned graduated Dragon Master with messy black hair. He regularly dons armored hero's clothes that are blue, with a torn shirt and dragon-mask that are both red. Billy's personality is based on the wise, independent, and self-determined side of Bruce Lee. 

Jimmy Lee is the former evil high-ranking Shadow Warrior turned sarcastic Double Master with spiky blonde hair. He also dons armored hero's clothes, but his are red, with a torn shirt and a dragon-mask that are both blue. Jimmy's personality is based on the cocky, charismatic, and belligerent side of Bruce Lee.

Dragon Warriors are other martial artists recruited by the Lee brothers in their fight against the Shadow Warriors, bestowing them with superhuman powers through the use of a smokeless, green "dragon fire".

Junior Dragons are Billy and Jimmy's younger students, and supporting characters throughout the series.

The Shadow Warriors are the main antagonists, a criminal organization composed mostly of mutants. These mutants are created by "high levels of EMF generated by (Metro City's) ancient underground power grid". They are led by the Shadow Master, with many powers including shapeshifting and teleporting, and he is able to trap warriors who fail him in the Shadow Mural. He is the half-brother of Billy and Jimmy's mother.

Episodes

Season 1

Season 2

Merchandise
In 1994, the tie-in video game Double Dragon V: The Shadow Falls, has been developed by Leland Interactive Media and published by Tradewest. The game was first ported to the Super NES, then it had a North America-only release for the Genesis, and the final port is the Jaguar which is the only console to have a Japan release of the game. Out of all three fighting game spin-offs of Double Dragon, this is the first and only game to receive criticism.

Tyco Toys produced a set of action figures. The figures included: Billy Lee, Jimmy Lee, Blaster, Vortex, Shadow Master, Sickle, and Trigger Happy. Three vehicles were also made: The (Dragon) Cycle, (Dragon) Cruiser, and Shadow Raven.

Home video releases

United States
In 1994, Buena Vista Home Video through the DIC Toon-Time Video label released three VHS tapes of the series. The Legend Begins and Deadly Mutants, released on June 7, 1994, contained "The Shadow Falls" and "The Legend Continues", and "The Price of Oblivion" and "Judgement Day" respectively, while "The Shield of the Shadow Khan", released on November 11, featured the episodes "Shadow Khan", "Shadow Claw" and "Doom Claw" edited into a Feature-Length format.

Invincible Pictures released Double Dragon: The Animated Series on DVD in Region 1 for the very first time in the country on August 13, 2019.

Discotek Media released Double Dragon on Blu-ray in May 2022.

United Kingdom
In June 2004, Anchor Bay UK released a single DVD containing four episodes.

Avenue Entertainment also released two DVDs containing two episodes each in July 2005.

References

External links
 Double Dragon series director Yoshihisa Kishimoto HP 
 Double Dragon cartoon at Double Dragon Dojo
 

Double Dragon
1990s American animated television series
Television series by DIC Entertainment
Animated series based on video games
First-run syndicated television programs in the United States
Martial arts television series
1993 American television series debuts
1994 American television series endings
USA Action Extreme Team
American children's animated action television series
American children's animated adventure television series
American children's animated fantasy television series
Italian children's animated action television series
Italian children's animated adventure television series
Italian children's animated fantasy television series
Animated television series about twins
Animated television series about brothers
Television series about mutants